Mohamed Sharael bin Mohd Taha (born 1981) is a Singaporean politician and engineer. A member of the governing People's Action Party (PAP), he has been the Member of Parliament (MP) representing the Pasir Ris East division of Pasir Ris–Punggol GRC since 2020.

Education
Sharael graduated from the National University of Singapore with a Bachelor of Engineering degree in mechanical engineering. He subsequently went on to complete a Master of Business Administration degree at the University of Oxford.

Career 
Previously based in the United Kingdom, Sharael was with Rolls-Royce managing projects in its engine assembly and test facilities across Europe. He was later seconded to Singapore Aero Engine Services.

Politics 
Sharael was fielded in the 2020 general election to contest in Pasir Ris–Punggol Group Representation Constituency (GRC) on the People's Action Party's ticket against the Peoples Voice and Singapore Democratic Alliance. His running mates were Teo Chee Hean, Janil Puthucheary, Desmond Tan, and Yeo Wan Ling. On 11 July 2020, Sharael and his team were declared elected to represent Pasir Ris–Punggol GRC in the 14th Parliament of Singapore, garnering 64.15% of the valid votes.

Personal life 
Sharael is married with three children.

References

External links
 Mohamed Sharael Taha on Parliament of Singapore

1981 births
Living people
National University of Singapore alumni
People's Action Party politicians
Members of the Parliament of Singapore
Singaporean people of Malay descent
Singaporean Muslims